Richard "Dick" Alwin James (May 22, 1934 – June 28, 2000) was an American football halfback and cornerback in the National Football League for the Washington Redskins, New York Giants and the Minnesota Vikings.  He played college football at the University of Oregon and was drafted in the eighth round of the 1956 NFL Draft.  James' mother was Mohawk/Mohican Native American.

He set a team record with four touchdowns in one game as the Redskins beat the Dallas Cowboys, 34-24 in 1961.  He scored 34 touchdowns in his National Football League career.  James was one of the smallest players in the NFL at 5-9 and 175 pounds. James was also known as gymnast, performing such acts as walking on his hands down flights of stairs before games. He died in 2000 of prostate cancer at the age of 66.

He had a short stint as a sports announcer in the Washington DC area after he retired mainly covering the Redskins on game day.

References

External links
 http://www.nfl.com/player/dickjames/2517385/careerstats
 http://www.goducks.com/ViewArticle.dbml?DB_OEM_ID=500&ATCLID=224871#j

1934 births
2000 deaths
American football halfbacks
Deaths from prostate cancer
Eastern Conference Pro Bowl players
Minnesota Vikings players
New York Giants players
Oregon Ducks football players
Sportspeople from Grants Pass, Oregon
Washington Redskins players
Deaths from cancer in Oregon
United States Football League announcers
Players of American football from Oregon